John Seymour Berry, 2nd Viscount Camrose  (12 July 1909 – 15 February 1995) was a British nobleman, politician, and newspaper proprietor.

Early life
Berry was born in Surrey on 12 July 1909, the eldest son of William Berry, later first Viscount Camrose and first Baronet Berry of Hackwood Park, and Mary Agnes Berry, née Corns.  His younger brother was Michael Berry (1911–2001).

He was educated at Eton College and Christ Church, Oxford, where he was tutored by Sir Roy Harrod.

Career
Berry began his career working for his family's provincial paper in Newcastle. He next worked for their papers in Manchester and Glasgow. In March 1938 he joined the 11th Anti-Aircraft Light Regiment. He later commanded an independent battery in Operation Torch when the Allied forces invaded North Africa. He was Deputy Chairman of The Daily Telegraph from 1939–87 and Vice Chairman of Amalgamated Press from 1942 to 1959.

On 10 March 1941, he was elected Member of Parliament (Conservative) for Hitchin in the by-election held after Sir Arnold Wilson was killed on active service. He held his seat until 1945, when it was won by Philip Asterley Jones (Labour).

Coterminously, he served in the City of London Yeomanry (Rough Riders). He saw active service in North Africa and Italy, rose to the rank of Major, was mentioned in despatches, and was awarded the Territorial Efficiency Decoration (TD).

Succession
He succeeded to his father's viscountcy and baronetcy on 15 June 1954, and took his seat in the House of Lords on 5 May 1955.

Personal life
At the age of seventy-six, and following a discreet friendship of more than thirty years, Lord Camrose married the Honourable Joan Yarde-Buller, daughter of Sir John Yarde-Buller, 3rd Baron Churston and Jessie Yarde-Buller (née Smither) Baroness Churston, then Jessie FitzGerald, Duchess of Leinster, who was perhaps better known by her stage name Denise Orme. Lady Camrose had twice been previously married, first to 
Loel Guinness, and secondly to Prince Aly Khan, son and heir apparent of Aga Khan III. Prince Aly was disinherited and consequently Lady Camrose's son Karīm succeeded as Aga Khan IV. Lady Camrose was also known as Princess Joan and Princess Tajudaullah.

Lord Camrose died aged 85 in Westminster, London, without issue, on 15 February 1995. He was survived by his wife, while the viscountcy and the baronetcy were inherited by his brother, Michael Berry, Baron Hartwell, who disclaimed the viscountcy for life.

Arms

References
Notes

Sources
ThePeerage.com
Historic painting bought for the nation, BBC News, 21 January 2002
Announcement of the death of Lady Camrose, including her obituary from Electronic Telegraph no. 708, 3 May 1997
Burke's Peerage, Baronetage, and Knightage (107th edn, 3 vols, Wilmington: Burke's Peerage, 2003), i, 673
Brief biographical entry on a website about his tutor Sir Roy Harrod

External links

1909 births
1995 deaths
Alumni of Christ Church, Oxford
British Army personnel of World War II
British newspaper publishers (people)
People educated at Eton College
Conservative Party (UK) MPs for English constituencies
UK MPs 1935–1945
Camrose, V2
2
City of London Yeomanry (Rough Riders) officers
Seymour Berry